Disney's Wild About Safety is an educational series that features short films that were produced by Disney Educational Productions, Duck Studios, and Underwriters' Laboratories. The series is directed and produced by Dave Bossert, and written by Douglas Segal. The music is composed by Mark Watters, and the video was edited by Melissa Time using Avid Media Composer and Adobe Premiere Pro.

The short films are played at Hong Kong Disneyland and Disneyland Paris. Each short film is approximately 12 minutes long. The short films appear as signs at the bag-checking area in the Disneyland Resort. In resorts in Walt Disney World & Disneyland, a video about hotel safety, the episodes "Safety Smart: On the Go!", and the "Safety Smart: On the Go!" short series are played on TV.

Synopsis
Supposedly set in the world of The Lion King, the series follows friends Timon (Bruce Lanoil) and Pumbaa (Ernie Sabella) as they learn to be "Safety Smart" by taking precautions such as being aware of your surroundings. The main storyline for the series is Timon not knowing/following proper safety guidance, and Pumbaa teaching it to him. At the end of each episode, Timon and Pumbaa sing a musical number reviewing all that they learned from the episode in question.

Disney explains: "The two loveable characters will teach students in kindergarten through third grade the importance of always being on the look-out for safety problems. Together with Timon and Pumbaa, students will learn a variety of safety lesson that will help themselves and others avoid injuries".

Characters
 Timon (voiced by Bruce Lanoil)
 Pumbaa (voiced by Ernie Sabella)
Simba and his mother Sarabi make a cameo appearance in Safety Smart: Go Green! in which Timon misunderstands a CFL light bulb as a "cute fluffy lion."

List of shorts
 Safety Smart: At Home! (27 January 2008) - Pumbaa teaches Timon how to be safe in a house when they move into their new home in the jungle.
 Safety Smart: Goes Green! (23 February 2009) - Pumbaa teaches Timon what they can do to make the earth a safe, healthier place from picking up trash and recycling it and conserving the resources.
 Safety Smart: In the Water! (27 April 2009) - Timon and Pumbaa discuss water safety.
 Safety Smart: About Fire! (2009) - Timon and Pumbaa discuss fire safety.
 Safety Smart: Healthy and Fit! (2010) - Pumbaa teaches Timon about exercising, getting sufficient sleep, and eating healthy.
 Safety Smart: Online! (2012) - Pumbaa teaches Timon about online safety, such as not giving personal information to strangers online, knowing who the person on the other end might actually be, how to handle cyberbullying situations, and getting a parent's permission before visiting new websites.
 Safety Smart: Honest and Real! (2013) - Timon is upset because he didn't win the Honest & Real Award until Pumbaa teaches him how to have good character by identifying and practicing the three character traits (honesty, kindness, and responsibility) as they prepare for Hilda Hippo's party to honor her for winning.
 Safety Smart: On the Go! (2013) - Pumbaa teaches Timon the safety rules when walking, riding a bicycle, riding in a car, on a plane, and bus, train or subway on their way to Pride Rock.

Awards and nominations

|-
| 2009
| Safety Smart: At Home!
| Teachers’ Choice Award
| 
|-
| 2009
| Safety Smart: Goes Green!
| Parents’ Choice Product Recommendation
| 
|-
| 2009
| Safety Smart: Goes Green!
| Environmental Media Award
| 
|-
| 2009
| Safety Smart: In the Water!
| Parents’ Choice Recommended Product
| 
|-
| 2010
| Safety Smart: About Fire!
| Parents’ Choice Recommended Product
| 
|-
| 2010
| Safety Smart: About Fire!
| AEP Distinguished Achievement Award
| 
|-
| 2012
| Safety Smart: Healthy & Fit!
| Parents’ Choice Silver Award
| 
|-
| 2013
| Safety Smart: Healthy & Fit!
| Learning Magazine Teachers’ Choice Award
| 
|-
| 2013
| Safety Smart: Online!
| Parents’ Choice Gold Award,
| 
|-
| 2013
| Safety Smart: Honest & Real!
| Parents’ Choice Silver Award
| 
|-
| 2013
| Safety Smart: On the Go!!
| Parents’ Choice Silver Award
| 
|}

References

The Lion King in amusement parks
Hong Kong Disneyland
2000s Disney animated short films
2010s Disney animated short films
Disneyland Paris
Disneyland Resort
Walt Disney World
Walt Disney Parks and Resorts
Walt Disney Parks and Resorts films